= Enzo Ferroni =

Italian chemist (1921–2007)

- Born: 25 March 1921; Florence, Italy
- Died: 9 April 2007 (aged 86)

Academic background
- Education: University of Florence

Academic work
- Discipline: Chemistry

Enzo Ferroni (25 March 1921 – 9 April 2007) was an Italian chemist, and rector of the University of Florence from 1976 to 1979.

== Biography ==
Enzo Ferroni was born in Florence, Italy on 25 March 1921 and was educated at the Royal University of Florence. Ferroni defended his chemistry master’s thesis (Recent advances and opinions on chemical kinetics) in 1945 under the supervision of Giorgio Piccardi.

Ferroni founded the Italian Centre for Colloids and Surfaces (CSGI) in 1993 and served as its President until his death in 2007.
